8-Bromoguanosine 3′,5′-cyclic monophosphate is a brominated derivative of cyclic guanosine monophosphate (cGMP).  It acts as an activator of cGMP-dependent protein kinases.

See also 
 8-Bromoadenosine 3′,5′-cyclic monophosphate (8-Br-cAMP)

References

Nucleotides
Bromoarenes
Purines
Phosphorus heterocycles
Oxygen heterocycles